Harmonia conformis, the large spotted ladybird, is a species of ladybird (the family Coccinellidae). It has a light reddish appearance and its colouration includes 20 large black spots, 18 of which are found on the elytra (wing covers). They are quite large for ladybirds, being about 6–7 mm long. It is a predator of other insects, eating aphids as both a larva and imago (adult). It is found in Australia, and has been introduced to New Zealand, where it is common in northern regions. Another member of the same genus, Harmonia antipodum, also occurs in New Zealand. This species, however, is a native and is much smaller and harder to find.

Life cycle
This ladybird has annual cycle where the duration of each life stages is dependent on the temperature of the environment. Their life cycle begins with the deposit of yellow eggs by the female in an area where there are prey readily available for the larvae once they have hatched. As larvae, they proceed through four sub-life stages beginning with a form that is dark in color with prothorax and six legs. The second sub-life stage is when the white external spine (scolus) develops. During the third sub-life stage, the larvae develop more coloration and three pairs of legs. The fourth sub-life stage is the further development of coloration and growth of abdominal segments which help the larvae during molting. Once the larva is fully grown, it attaches itself to a plant to form its pupa.The adults then hatch from this pupa and begin to seek out mates.

References

External links

Common Spotted Ladybird - Harmonia conformis (includes many photos)

Coccinellidae
Beetles of New Zealand
Beetles of Australia
Beetles described in 1835
Taxa named by Jean Baptiste Boisduval